Portugal Socialista (also known as Orgão Central do Partido Socialista) is a Portuguese language quarterly magazine published in Lisbon, Portugal. The magazine is the organ of Socialist Party.

History and profile
Portugal Socialista was established in 1967. The publication was started as a weekly newspaper and was published illegally. It is official media outlet of the Socialist Party. It became a monthly magazine in 1977. Then the magazine began to be published on a quarterly basis. It has its headquarters in Lisbon. Pedro Delgado Alves, a member of the Portuguese parliament for the Socialist Party, is the director of the magazine.

See also
 List of magazines in Portugal

References

1967 establishments in Portugal
Magazines established in 1977
Magazines published in Lisbon
Monthly magazines published in Portugal
Newspapers established in 1967
Political magazines published in Portugal
Portuguese-language magazines
Portuguese-language newspapers
Socialist magazines
Socialist newspapers
Quarterly magazines
Weekly newspapers published in Portugal